Salish may refer to:

 Salish peoples, a group of First Nations/Native Americans
 Coast Salish peoples, several First Nations/Native American groups in the coastal regions of the Pacific Northwest
 Interior Salish peoples, several First Nations/Native American groups in the inland regions of the Pacific Northwest
 Salishan languages, a group of languages
 Coast Salish languages
 Interior Salish languages
 Bitterroot Salish
 The Salish-Spokane-Kalispel language
 The Salish Wool Dog bred by the Salish peoples

Places 
 Salish Sea, an inland sea consisting of Puget Sound, the Strait of Juan de Fuca and the Strait of Georgia
 Salish Mountains, a mountain range in Montana
 Salishan, Tacoma, Washington, a neighborhood of Tacoma.

In fiction 
 the Salish, a people featured in the episode "Spirits" of the television series Stargate SG-1
 Salish, a character in the episode "The Paradise Syndrome" of the television series Star Trek
 Anna Delaney, a character in the BBC drama Taboo (2017 TV series), who is referred to as a person of Salish heritage.

See also
Confederated Salish and Kootenai Tribes of the Flathead Nation in Montana
Coast Salish art
Salian Franks

Language and nationality disambiguation pages